Five Forks is an unincorporated community in Robeson County, North Carolina, United States, at the western terminus of North Carolina Highway 904, west-southwest of Fairmont. It lies at an elevation of 135 feet (41 m).

References

Unincorporated communities in North Carolina
Unincorporated communities in Robeson County, North Carolina